The 2022 Portland Timbers season is the club's 36th season of existence and the 12th season for the Portland Timbers in Major League Soccer (MLS), the top-flight professional soccer league in the United States and Canada. The season covers the period from the end of the Timbers' last match in MLS Cup Final in 2021 to the team's last season in October 2022.

Background 
The Timbers finished fourth in the Western Conference in the 2021 MLS season, advancing to the MLS Cup Final (which they hosted) where they lost on penalties to New York City FC.

Most of the season focused on fan discontent, with many supporters withholding season ticket pledges and attendance lagging—partially due to the lasting effects of the COVID-19 pandemic and cost-cutting, but also due to a large-scale abuse scandal coming from the NWSL and sister club Portland Thorns, which directly impacted the Timbers organization.

After a report commissioned by U.S. Soccer dropped on October 3, even more fan pressure began to mount. The report named the three men at the helm of the Timbers/Thorns organization as part of the problems brought about in the scandal: club owner Merritt Paulson, Timbers GM Gavin Wilkinson (who also held the same role for the Thorns until stepping aside in 2021), and president Mike Golub. The report cited Wilkinson's treatment of a former Thorns player and endorsement of disgraced ex-coach Paul Riley—who was accused of sexual abuse by multiple players—as well as Golub's sexually inappropriate conduct toward another former Thorns coach and Paulson's failure to act upon these accusations. The report led to Paulson stating he would recuse himself, Wilkinson and Golub of Thorns duties. On October 5, the club fired both Wilkinson and Golub, with Ned Grabavoy assuming Timbers roster decisions in the interim.

The Timbers were in position at the final matchday to qualify for the playoffs, but held off qualification to the final matchday due to losing at home against Los Angeles FC (which helped LAFC clinch the Supporters' Shield). They were eliminated by Real Salt Lake in the last game of the season following a 3–1 defeat at America First Field, finishing the season on 46 points, one fewer than RSL.

Roster 

 (HG) = Homegrown Player
 (GA) = Generation Adidas Player
 (DP) = Designated Player
 (INT) = Player using International Roster Slot
 (L) = On Loan to the Timbers
 (LO) = Loaned out to another club
 (SEIL) = Season-ending Injury List

Player and staff transactions

In

Out

2022 MLS SuperDraft picks

Non-competitive

Preseason friendlies 
The Timbers began their preseason on January 18, 2022. On January 26, 2022, the Timbers announced that the club will host a Preseason Tournament.

Competitions

Major League Soccer

Standings

Western Conference

Overall

Matches
All matches are in Pacific time

U.S. Open Cup

Top scorers
The list is sorted by shirt number when total goals are equal.

References

Portland Timbers (MLS) seasons
Portland
Portland Timbers
Portland Timbers
Portland Timbers